Mukhammadkarim Khurramov (born 4 April 1997) is an Uzbek judoka. 

He is the gold medallist of the 2020 Judo Grand Slam Düsseldorf in the -100 kg class and shall represent Uzbekistan at the 2020 Summer Olympics.

References

External links
 

1997 births
Living people
Uzbeks
Uzbekistani male judoka
Judoka at the 2020 Summer Olympics
Olympic judoka of Uzbekistan
20th-century Uzbekistani people
21st-century Uzbekistani people